Klingende toner is a 1945 Danish film directed by Lau Lauritzen Jr. and Alice O'Fredericks.

Cast
 Emil Christoffersen as himself
 Kirsten Thrane Petersen as herself
 Erik Sjöberg as himself
 Wandy Tworek as himself

References

External links

1945 films
1940s Danish-language films
Danish black-and-white films
Films directed by Lau Lauritzen Jr.
Films directed by Alice O'Fredericks